David John Hill (born 4 April 1946) is an English rock musician. He is the lead guitarist, a backing vocalist and the sole continuous member in the English band Slade. Hill is known for his flamboyant stage clothes and hairstyle.

Early life
Born in Flete House, Holbeton, Devon, the son of a mechanic, he moved with his parents to Penn, Wolverhampton, when he was a year old. He attended the city's Springdale Junior School and Highfields Secondary school. He bought his first guitar from a mail-order catalogue and received some guitar lessons from a science teacher at his school. He then formed a band called The Young Ones with some school friends. He worked in an office for Tarmac Limited for over two years after leaving school.

Slade

Hill originally played with drummer Don Powell in a band called The Vendors, whose name was then changed to The N' Betweens. The pair then met bass player Jimmy Lea and singer Noddy Holder, whereafter Slade was born.

Though Hill is left-handed, he plays guitar right-handed. Hill's best known guitar was the "John Birch Superyob" that was built in 1973. The guitar was used by Madness guitarist Chris Foreman in the video for Madness' song "Shut Up" and was later owned by Marco Pirroni of Adam and the Ants.
 
Hill is known for his outrageous costumes. The music journalist Stuart Maconie commented:  His costumes and antics caused some friction with the more serious Lea. This led to a show-down in a BBC dressing room before a recording of Top of the Pops, where Hill replied to the band's criticism of his dress by saying "You write 'em Jim, I'll sell em!" Although he was famous for his hairstyle, in 1977 he shaved his entire head completely bald and kept it that way before growing his trademark hairstyle back a few years later.

During 1983, both Hill and Powell were working on a Dave Hill solo project with local musicians around the Midlands area. By 1984, the project had not been completed. The then-editor of the Slade fan club, Haden Donovan, described the project as "very interesting and very un-Slade-like."

In 1989, Hill formed his own group, Blessings in Disguise. This featured Holder, ex-Wizzard keyboard player Bill Hunt, Craig Fenney and Bob Lamb. The debut single, released in 1989 for the Christmas market, was a ballad cover of The Everly Brothers' "Crying in the Rain" with Holder drafted in for lead vocals, backed by a Hill/Hunt composition, "Wild Nights". The record was a commercial failure. The band also recorded a cover of the Elvis Presley song "A Fool Such As I" which was unreleased.

Hill attended the launch of a £2 million appeal to raise funds for Queen Alexandra College for the Blind in Birmingham. There he heard a song called "A Chance to Be", sung by blind and visually-impaired children. Hill was so moved by the occasion that he agreed to perform and produce the recording of the song. The two writers of the song were staff at the institute, Daniel Somers and Colin Baines. Hill's band name, Blessing in Disguise, was picked as the group name and the single featured ex-Shakatak female vocalist Norma Lewis rather than Holder. The B-side was a track written by Hill entitled "You're the Reason that I'm Strong". It was the last recording made by the group and was released in 1991.

Slade finally split up in 1992, but Hill decided to carry the group on as Slade II. Don Powell joined him and the band has continued to this day with various line-ups. In 1997 the name of Slade II was shortened back to Slade. The band released the album Keep on Rockin' in 1994, which has also been re-packaged as Superyob, and also as Cum on Let's Party!

Personal life
He embraced the image of a yob for performances. As well as the references to "Superyob" above, Hill, since a young age used the numberplate "YOB 1" on his cars. 
Hill married his wife Jan in Mexico City in the 1970s, and they have three children: Jade, Bibi, and Sam. They live in Lower Penn, Staffordshire, England, where Hill occasionally teaches music at Lower Penn School and Penn Hall School.
In 2010 during a concert in Nuremberg, Germany, Hill suffered a stroke, from which he recovered to continue touring and recording.

In December 2016, Hill was knocked down by a cyclist in Brighton. He suffered a broken elbow as a result of the accident, and Slade called off shows planned for early 2017.

Autobiography
Hill published his autobiography, entitled So Here It Is: The Autobiography, in November 2017.

Hill had first announced the idea of releasing a biography in the early 1990s. In a 1992 interview with the Slade fan club, he said: "I approached John Ogden of the Wolverhampton Express and Star with a view to putting down some of my experiences and stories, to see if a book could be produced that would be entertaining and amusing."

Later in November 2016, Hill announced he was in the process of writing an autobiography, with a possible 2017 release through Unbound, subject to it reaching the online pledge target. He revealed: "I've written my autobiography for my fans and for my family, especially my grandkids. I've got plenty of funny tales but also some others which show that my life hasn't been all rock 'n' roll." So Here It Is: The Autobiography was released on 16 November 2017. Noddy Holder provided the foreword and Noel Gallagher the afterword.

References

External links
 

1946 births
Living people
English rock guitarists
Lead guitarists
musicians from Wolverhampton
Musicians from Devon
Glam rock musicians
Slade members